Kreshnik Fazliu (born 5 September 1984), known professionally as MC Kresha, is a Kosovo-Albanian rapper and songwriter. Born and raised in Mitrovica, Fazliu is credited as a viable hip hop artist in the Albanian-speaking Balkans.

Life and career

1984–present: Early life and career beginnings 

Kreshnik Fazliu was born on 5 September 1984 into an Albanian family in the city of Mitrovicë, then part of the SFR Yugoslavia, present Kosovo. In July 2018, Fazliu was announced as an act at the Sunny Hill Festival on its debut edition in Pristina. In August 2019, he was approached to perform for a second time at the Sunny Hill Festival. Fazliu's fourth collaborative album, Muzikë e Alltisë, was released in January 2022. Songs featured on the record included "Hotel Mahalla", "Paret Lejla", "Rammstein" and "Stuhi mbi oqean" featuring Albanian singer Elvana Gjata, which attained commercial success in Albania.

Discography

Albums

Studio albums

Collaborative albums

Singles

As lead artist

As featured artist

Other charted songs

References 

1984 births
21st-century Albanian rappers
Albanian rappers
Albanian hip hop singers
Albanian-language singers
Albanian songwriters
Kosovan people of Albanian descent
Kosovan rappers
Living people
Musicians from Mitrovica, Kosovo